Psittacara is a genus of parakeets in the tribe Arini. Species of the genus are found in Central and South America, the Caribbean and one species reaching the southern United States. Until 2013, all the species were placed in the genus Aratinga. Many of the Psittacara species are kept in aviculture or as companion parrots, where they are commonly known as conures.

Taxonomy
The members of this genus were formerly placed in the genus Aratinga. Molecular phylogenetic studies had found that Aratinga was non-monophyletic so in order to create monophylectic genera James Van Remsen Jr. and collaborators proposed in 2013 that Aratinga should be split and a group of species moved to the resurrected genus Psittacara. The genus had been introduced in 1825 by the Irish zoologist Nicholas Aylward Vigors with the white-eyed parakeet as the type species.

Species
The genus contains 13 species including one which is now extinct:

 Green parakeet (Psittacara holochlorus)
 Socorro parakeet (Psittacara brevipes) – formerly a subspecies of the green parakeet
 Red-throated parakeet (Psittacara rubritorquis)
 Pacific parakeet (Psittacara strenuus)
 Scarlet-fronted parakeet (Psittacara wagleri)
 Cordilleran parakeet (Psittacara frontatus) – formerly a subspecies of the scarlet-fronted parakeet
 Mitred parakeet (Psittacara mitratus)
 Red-masked parakeet (Psittacara erythrogenys)
 Finsch's parakeet (Psittacara finschi)
 White-eyed parakeet (Psittacara leucophthalmus)
 Cuban parakeet (Psittacara euops)
 Hispaniolan parakeet (Psittacara chloropterus)
 Puerto Rican parakeet (Psittacara maugei)

Hypothetical species
 Guadeloupe parakeet (Psittacara labati)
Jean-Baptiste Labat described a population of small parrots living on Guadeloupe, which have been postulated to be a separate species based on little evidence. They were originally named Conurus labati, but no specimens or remains of these parrots exist. Their taxonomy may never be fully elucidated, and so their postulated status as a separate species is hypothetical.

References

 
Bird genera
Arini (tribe)